Max Gresham (born April 30, 1993) is an American professional stock car racing driver. He was the winner of the 2011 NASCAR K&N Pro Series East championship.

Personal life and early career
Born in Stockbridge, Georgia in 1993, Gresham's racing career started at age 8. He has won track championships at Atlanta Motor Speedway and Charlotte Motor Speedway, and won the Legends Car Semi-Pro National Championship in 2006 at the age of 13. He graduated from high school in 2011.

Racing career

K&N Pro Series East and ARCA Racing Series
Starting in 2009 and running through the 2011 racing season, Gresham competed in the K&N Pro Series East, a NASCAR regional touring series, driving for Joe Gibbs Racing. He won four races during his career in the K&N Pro Series East, with the first coming at South Boston Speedway in April 2010; he also won once in twelve starts in the ARCA Racing Series, at Mansfield Motorsports Park.

In 2011, Gresham won the K&N Pro Series East series championship by 63 points over Darrell Wallace Jr. Gresham's K&N Pro Series East championship was the second won by Joe Gibbs Racing, following the team's winning the 2007 series championship with Joey Logano.

Camping World Truck Series

Gresham made his debut in the Camping World Truck Series in 2011 at Las Vegas Motor Speedway. He made three starts late in the season in the series, finishing 54th in the final season standings, in preparation for 2012, when he will be competing for Rookie of the Year in the NASCAR Camping World Truck Series, driving the No. 24 for Joe Denette Motorsports as a teammate to four-time Truck Series champion Ron Hornaday Jr. However, Gresham's performance in the Trucks failed to live up to expectations, and he parted ways with JDM after eight races in the 2012 season. He signed with Eddie Sharp Racing to run selected races later in the year shortly thereafter; he returned to ESR for the full 2013 season. His team ESR shut down midway the season, but his ride was secured by SGR allowing him to finish the season. He finished 16th in the point standings, including a best finish of 3rd at Charlotte.

Motorsports career results

NASCAR
(key) (Bold – Pole position awarded by qualifying time. Italics – Pole position earned by points standings or practice time. * – Most laps led.)

Camping World Truck Series

K&N Pro Series East

Camping World West Series

 Season still in progress
 Ineligible for series points

ARCA Racing Series
(key) (Bold – Pole position awarded by qualifying time. Italics – Pole position earned by points standings or practice time. * – Most laps led.)

References

External links
 
 

Living people
1993 births
People from Griffin, Georgia
Racing drivers from Atlanta
Racing drivers from Georgia (U.S. state)
NASCAR drivers
ARCA Menards Series drivers
Joe Gibbs Racing drivers